is a railway station on the Takayama Main Line in the city of Takayama, Gifu Prefecture, Japan, operated by Central Japan Railway Company (JR Central).

Lines

Station layout
Hozue Station has two opposed ground-level side platforms connected by a footbridge. The station is unattended.

Platforms

Adjacent stations

History
Hozue Station opened on October 25, 1934. The station was absorbed into the JR Central network upon the privatization of Japanese National Railways (JNR) on April 1, 1987.

Surrounding area
Takayama Nishi High School

See also
 List of Railway Stations in Japan

External links

Railway stations in Gifu Prefecture
Takayama Main Line
Railway stations in Japan opened in 1934
Stations of Central Japan Railway Company
Takayama, Gifu